Frederick "Fred" Hughes (birth unknown – death unknown) was a Welsh rugby union and professional rugby league footballer who played in the 1940s.

Background
Fred Hughes was born in Llanelli. Wales, and he was the father of the association footballer of the 1960s, 1970s and 1980s for England and Liverpool; Emlyn Hughes.

International honours
Fred Hughes won 3 caps for Wales in 1945–1946 while at Barrow and Workington Town.

References

External links

Barrow Raiders players
Liverpool City (rugby league) players
Llanelli RFC players
Rugby league players from Llanelli
Rugby union players from Llanelli
Place of death missing
Rugby league props

Wales national rugby league team players
Welsh rugby league players
Welsh rugby union players
Workington Town players
Year of birth missing
Year of death missing